Irene Miracle is an American film and television actress and director.

Early life
Miracle was raised in Oklahoma of "French Arcadian ... Scots-Irish, Russian, French and Osage" descent.

Acting career
Her first film appearance was as a murder victim in Night Train Murders (1975), an Italian Last House on the Left-clone. Her most prestigious role was in Alan Parker's Midnight Express (1978), a worldwide box office success. For her role as the girlfriend of the incarcerated protagonist, she won the Golden Globe Award for New Star of the Year - Female.  Miracle followed that film with another major role in Dario Argento's Inferno (1980), as a woman who comes to believe the New York City apartment building she lives in also houses a centuries-old witch.  Since then, she has continued her acting work, while also writing, directing and producing.

In 1979, Miracle appeared in the episode "Now You See Her..." of the NBC television crime drama series The Eddie Capra Mysteries.

Directing career
In 2009, Miracle wrote and directed the short drama film Changeling ( Dawnland).

Filmography

References

External links
 

1954 births
Living people
American film actresses
American people of Osage descent
American people of Scotch-Irish descent
American people of Russian descent
American people of French descent
American television actresses
New Star of the Year (Actress) Golden Globe winners
21st-century American women